The napkin folding problem is a problem in geometry and the mathematics of paper folding that explores whether folding a square or a rectangular napkin can increase its perimeter. The problem is known under several names, including the Margulis napkin problem, suggesting it is due to Grigory Margulis, and the Arnold's rouble problem referring to Vladimir Arnold and the folding of a Russian ruble bank note. Some versions of the problem were solved by Robert J. Lang, Svetlana Krat, Alexey S. Tarasov, and Ivan Yaschenko. One form of the problem remains open.

Formulations 
There are several way to define the notion of folding, giving different interpretations. By convention, the napkin is always a unit square.

Folding along a straight line 
Considering the folding as a reflection along a line that reflects all the layers of the napkin, the perimeter is always non-increasing, thus never exceeding 4.

By considering more general foldings that possibly reflect only a single layer of the napkin (in this case, each folding is a reflection of a connected component of folded napkin on one side of a straight line), it is still open if a sequence of these foldings can increase the perimeter. In other words, it is still unknown if there exists a solution that can be folded using some combination of mountain folds, valley folds, reverse folds, and/or sink folds (with all folds in the latter two cases being formed along a single line). Also unknown, of course, is whether such a fold would be possible using the more-restrictive pureland origami.

Folding without stretching 
One can ask for a realizable construction within the constraints of rigid origami where the napkin is never stretched whilst being folded. In 2004 A. Tarasov showed that such constructions can indeed be obtained. This can be considered a complete solution to the original problem.

Where only the result matters 

One can ask whether there exists a folded planar napkin (without regard as to how it was folded into that shape). 

Robert J. Lang showed in 1997 that several classical origami constructions give rise to an easy solution. In fact, Lang showed that the perimeter can be made as large as desired by making the construction more complicated, while still resulting in a flat folded solution. However his constructions are not necessarily rigid origami because of their use of sink folds and related forms. Although no stretching is needed in sink and unsink folds, it is often (though not always) necessary to curve facets and/or sweep one or more creases continuously through the paper in intermediate steps before obtaining a flat result. Whether a general rigidly foldable solution exists based on sink folds is an open problem.

In 1998, I. Yaschenko constructed a 3D folding with projection onto a plane which has a bigger perimeter. This indicated to mathematicians that there was probably a flat folded solution to the problem.

The same conclusion was made by Svetlana Krat. Her approach is different, she gives very simple construction of a "rumpling" which increase perimeter and then proves that any "rumpling" can be arbitrarily well approximated by a "folding". In essence she shows that the precise details of the how to do the folds don't matter much if stretching is allowed in intermediate steps.

Solutions

Lang's solutions

Lang devised two different solutions. Both involved sinking flaps and so were not necessarily rigidly foldable. The simplest was based on the origami bird base and gave a solution with a perimeter of about 4.12 compared to the original perimeter of 4.

The second solution can be used to make a figure with a perimeter as large as desired. He divides the square into a large number of smaller squares and employs the 'sea urchin' type origami construction described in his 1990 book, Origami Sea Life. The crease pattern shown is the n = 5 case and can be used to produce a flat figure with 25 flaps, one for each of the large circles, and sinking is used to thin them. When very thin the 25 arms will give a 25 pointed star with a small center and a perimeter approaching N2/(N − 1). In the case of N = 5 this is about 6.25, and the total length goes up approximately as N.

History 
Arnold states in his book that he formulated the problem in 1956, but the formulation was left intentionally vague. He called it 'the rumpled rouble problem', and it was the first of many interesting problems he set at seminars in Moscow over 40 years. In the West, it became known as Margulis napkin problem after Jim Propp's newsgroup posting in 1996. Despite attention, it received folklore status and its origin is often referred as "unknown".

References

External links 
 Erik Demaine and Joseph O'Rourke, Geometric Folding Algorithms: Linkages, Origami, Polyhedra
 Igor Pak, Lectures on Discrete and Polyhedral Geometry, Section 40.

Discrete geometry
Paper folding